Three ships of the Royal Navy have borne the name HMS Carcass, named after the carcass, an early form of incendiary bomb or shell:

  was an 8-gun bomb vessel launched in 1695 and sold in 1713.
  was a 14-gun bomb vessel launched in 1740 and sold in 1748.
  was an 8-gun bomb vessel launched in 1759 and sold in 1784.

Royal Navy ship names